Antigonia Psaphara or Antigoneia Psaphara, or simply Antigonia, Antigonea, or Antigoneia (Ἀντιγόνεια) was a Hellenistic city in Macedon in the district Crusis (Krousis) in Chalcidice, placed by Livy between Aeneia and Pallene. It is called Psaphara by Ptolemy probably in order to distinguish it from Antigonia in Paeonia.

The site of Antigonia Psaphara is about 3 miles (5 km) north of Nea Kallikrateia.

References

External links
Smith, William (editor); Dictionary of Greek and Roman Geography, "Antigoneia", London, (1854)
Hazlitt, Classical Gazetteer, "Antigonia"
https://web.archive.org/web/20110928155211/http://www.macedonia.se/en/Load/56/psaphara/

Hellenistic colonies in Chalcidice
Antigonid colonies in Macedonia
Former populated places in Greece
Populated places in ancient Macedonia